The 2010 World Group II Play-offs were four ties which involved the losing nations of the World Group II and four nations from the three Zonal Group I competitions. Nations that won their play-off ties entered the 2011 World Group II, while losing nations joined their respective zonal groups.

Poland vs. Spain

Sweden vs. China

Canada vs. Argentina

Slovenia vs. Japan

References 

World Group II Play-offs